Brian Slawson (born 1956) is an American percussionist, arranger and composer. He is best known for his Grammy-nominated recording, Bach On Wood.

Early life

Brian Montgomery Slawson was born on August 2, 1956 to Ronald and Mildred Slawson in Plattsburgh, New York and was raised in Brookfield, Connecticut. At age 7, he played snare drum in a local fife & drum corps, leading to private drum set instruction at age 10. Brian attended Brookfield High School. After preliminary studies in percussion at the Hartt School, Slawson attended the Juilliard School in New York. Soon after, he signed his first recording contract with CBS Masterworks.

Professional career

In addition to being a sought after studio musician, stage performer and clinician, Brian's multimedia company, Slawsongs, produces custom music for film, television and radio. He is Principal Timpanist of the Brevard Symphony Orchestra, Professor of Percussion at Eastern Florida State College and a published author for Alfred Music Publishing. Slawson is the voice of Gusto the Bulldog in Warner Bros. Music Expressions, appears in Macmillan/McGraw-Hill's Spotlight on Music and is a featured performer at Lincoln Center's Meet the Artist Series.

Discography

1985 - Bach on Wood (CBS Masterworks)
1985 - A Yule Log (CBS FM)
1988 - Distant Drums (CBS FM)
1991 - Bach Beat (Sony Classical)
1999 - Boomer (Powkn)
2003 - XClassics (Belltone)
2010 - BoomerBeats (Belltone)

Television & Radio Appearances (National)

The Tonight Show
Entertainment Tonight
CBS Morning News
All Things Considered (National Public Radio)

Sponsored Endorsements

Ludwig-Musser
Zildjian
Vic Firth
Remo
Rhythm Tech
Alternate Mode
Grover Pro Percussion

Print Music (listed by publisher) 

2011 Dynamic Solos for Snare Drum (Alfred Music Publishing)
2011 Classic Mallet Trios (Alfred Music Publishing)
2012 Dynamic Solos for Timpani (Alfred Music Publishing)
2012 Classic Mallet Trios Volume 2 (Alfred Music Publishing)
2013 Classic Mallet Trios - Tchaikovsky (Alfred Music Publishing)
2013 Classic Mallet Trios - Bach (Alfred Music Publishing)
2013 Dynamic Solos for Mallets (Alfred Music Publishing)
2014 Classic Mallet Trios - Beethoven (Alfred Music Publishing)
2014 Dynamic Duets for Snare Drum (Alfred Music Publishing)
2015 Dynamic Solos for Mallets (digital version) (Alfred Music Publishing)
2009 Two-Part Three-Pack (by J.S. Bach, arr. Slawson) (Tapspace Publications)
2009 Goldberg Variation 28 (by J.S. Bach, arr. Slawson) (Tapspace Publications)
2009 El Paso Waltz (Slawson) (Tapspace Publications)
2009 Concerto in A Minor (by J.S. Bach, arr. Slawson) (Tapspace Publications)
2009 Children's Medley (by J.S. Bach, arr. Slawson) (Tapspace Publications)
2009 Tale of the Dragon (Slawson) (Tapspace Publications)
2009 Odd Duck (Slawson)  (Tapspace Publications)
2009 Winter (by Vivaldi, arr. Slawson) (Tapspace Publications)
2009 Entrance of the Queen of Sheba (by Handel, arr. Slawson) (Tapspace Publications)
2009 Sonata in F (by Handel, arr. Slawson) (Tapspace Publications)
2010 Jesu, Joy of Man's Desiring (by J.S. Bach, arr. Slawson) (Tapspace Publications)
2010 Scherzo from A Midsummer Night's Dream (by Mendelssohn, arr. Slawson) (Tapspace Publications)
2010 Top Tank (Slawson) (Tapspace Publications)
2011 Menuetto (by W.A. Mozart, arr. Slawson) (Tapspace Publications)
2011 Intermezzo from A Midsummer Night's Dream (by Mendelssohn, arr. Slawson) (Tapspace Publications)
2011 Brandenburg No. 2/Allegro Moderato (by J.S. Bach, arr. Slawson) (Tapspace Publications)
2011 Shepherd's Song (by Beethoven, arr. Slawson) (Tapspace Publications)
2012 Sonata in A Minor (by D. Scarlatti, arr. Slawson) (Tapspace Publications)
2012 Etude in C Sharp Minor (by Scriabin, arr. Slawson) (Tapspace Publications)
2012 The Three Banditos (Slawson) (Tapspace Publications)
2017 Animal Cracker Rag (Slawson) (Tapspace Publications)
2013 Sonata in F Minor (by D. Scarlatti, arr. Slawson) (Tapspace Publishing)
2013 Waltz in C Sharp Minor (by D. Scarlatti, arr. Slawson) (Tapspace Publishing)
2013 Danse Macabre (by Saint-Seans, arr. Slawson) (Tapspace Publishing)
2014 Upbeat Suite (by Bizet, Tchaikovsky, Mussorgsky, arr. Slawson) (Tapspace Publishing)
2015 Cemetery Salsa (Slawson) (Tapspace Publishing)
2015 The Storm (by Beethoven, arr. Slawson) (Tapspace Publishing)
2015 Waltz in C-Sharp Minor (by Chopin, arr. Slawson) (Tapspace Publishing)
2016 Beethoven's Fantasy (by Beethoven, arr. Slawson) (Tapspace Publishing)
2016 Animals (Slawson) (Tapspace Publishing)
2016 Pop Drop (Slawson) (Tapspace Publishing)
2016 Ticking Tacos (Slawson) (Tapspace Publishing)
2016 The Three Buccaneers (Slawson) (Tapspace Publishing)
2016 A Little Malletmusik (Slawson) (Tapspace Publishing)
2016 Three Romanian Dances (by Bartok, arr. Slawson) (Tapspace Publishing) 
2016 Christmas Day (Slawson) (Tapspace Publishing)
2017 When You Hear the Drum (Slawson) (Tapspace Publishing)
2017 Jokers Wild (Slawson) (Tapspace Publishing)
2018 Soca Polka (Slawson) (Tapspace Publishing)
2018 Angels in the Moonlight (Slawson) (Tapspace Publishing)
2018 Cemetery Salsa (Slawson) (Tapspace Publishing)
2018 Bongito (Slawson) (Tapspace Publishing)
2018 Cricket (Slawson) (Tapspace Publishing)
2019 Two-Beat Tango (Slawson) (Tapspace Publishing)
2019 Dreams from the Dark Forest (Slawson) (Tapspace Publishing)
2019 Pistoleros (Slawson) (Tapspace Publishing)
2019 Into the Light / Füm Drum (Slawson) (Tapspace Publishing)
2020 Teardrop for Vibraphone (Slawson) (Tapspace Publishing)
2020 Winterland (Slawson) (Tapspace Publishing)

Personal Website

www.slawsongs.com

References

References

American percussionists
Living people
1956 births
Juilliard School alumni
People from Brookfield, Connecticut